Wong Yew Tong (born 16 June 1971) is a Singaporean athlete. He competed in the men's high jump at the 1996 Summer Olympics.

Career
Wong Yew Tong broke the national record for men's high jump in 1995 Southeast Asian Games with a height of 2.22 metres, which still stands to date.

References

External links
 

1971 births
Living people
Athletes (track and field) at the 1996 Summer Olympics
Singaporean male high jumpers
Olympic athletes of Singapore
Place of birth missing (living people)
Athletes (track and field) at the 1994 Asian Games
Asian Games competitors for Singapore